Stefan Milojević (born February 6, 1989) is a professional French-Serbian football player who currently plays for Woodlands Wellington as a midfielder.

Born in an area of former Yugoslavia (now Serbia), he was raised in southern France and spent most of his footballing career in France.

Career
Milojević played for the youth teams of Solitaire Paris, AS Monaco and Birmingham City.

His senior career was spent with Swiss club CS Chênois, as well as French lower league clubs ROS Menton and USC Corte. Milojević signed with Singapore's Geylang International in June 2012. He played with the Eagles for two seasons, before joining Woodlands Wellington in 2014.

References

External links

Interview with new signing, Stefan Milojevic! at Geylang International Official Website

1989 births
Living people
Serbian footballers
French footballers
Association football midfielders
AS Monaco FC players
Birmingham City F.C. players
CS Chênois players
Rapid de Menton players
Geylang International FC players
Woodlands Wellington FC players
Singapore Premier League players
French expatriate footballers
Serbian expatriate footballers
Expatriate footballers in England
Expatriate footballers in Switzerland
Expatriate footballers in Singapore
USC Corte players